The 1924 United States presidential election in North Carolina took place on November 4, 1924, as part of the 1924 United States presidential election, which was held throughout all contemporary forty-eight states. Voters chose twelve representatives, or electors to the Electoral College, who voted for president and vice president.

Background
As a former Confederate state, North Carolina had a history of Jim Crow laws, disfranchisement of its African-American population and dominance of the Democratic Party in state politics. However, unlike the Deep South, the Republican Party had sufficient historic Unionist white support from the mountains and northwestern Piedmont to gain a stable one-third of the statewide vote total in most general elections Like Virginia, Tennessee and Oklahoma, the relative strength of Republican opposition meant that North Carolina did not have statewide white primaries, although certain counties did use the white primary.

In 1920, with the passage of the Nineteenth Amendment, North Carolina became the first former Confederate state to abolish its poll tax, which when in force was less severe than other former Confederate states with the result that more whites participated. In that election North Carolina would, alongside Kentucky, see the largest mobilisation of female voters in the entire country. Despite some thought that Republican nominee Harding might threaten to carry the state, in fact North Carolina showed the smallest swing against the Democrats of any state in the Union.

During the prolonged Democratic Party primaries, North Carolina shifted its delegates between William Gibbs McAdoo, Virginian Carter Glass, and Alabamian Oscar W. Underwood, except for a few votes for favorite son George Gordon Battle. Ultimately neither McAdoo nor New York Governor Al Smith – who represented the immigrant, anti-Prohibition wing of the party – could prove acceptable to all Democratic delegates and the nomination went to a compromise candidate in Wall Street lawyer John W. Davis of West Virginia. Although West Virginia was a border state whose limited African-American population had not been disenfranchised, Davis did share the extreme social conservatism of Southern Democrats of his era; he supported poll taxes and opposed women's suffrage. In addition, Davis, like Coolidge, favored strictly limited government. At the same time a progressive third-party run was predicted as early as winter 1923–24, and ultimately Wisconsin Senator Robert M. La Follette Sr. would be nominated by the “Committee for Progressive Political Action”.

Vote
None of the three candidates did any campaigning in a state which had voted Democratic at every election since 1876. All media polls from September onwards suggested that North Carolina would always go to Davis. A Digest poll at the end of October, which included votes for some candidates not on the ballot, had Davis winning by 21.5 percentage points, and that proved a good guide to the final margin, which saw Davis carry North Carolina by 19.16 points, an increase of 5.68 points upon James M. Cox’s margin in 1920 and in fact 2.77 points greater than Woodrow Wilson’s margin in the state in 1916. Although Progressive Party candidate La Follette would relegate Davis to third in twelve states and carry his home state of Wisconsin, he had almost no appeal in pro-League of Nations North Carolina. With only 1.38 percent of the vote, North Carolina would be La Follette’s second-weakest state after neighbouring South Carolina.

Results

Results by county

Notes

References

North Carolina
1924
1924 North Carolina elections